The following article presents a summary of the 2023 football season in Indonesia.

National teams

Men's national football team

2022 AFF Championship

Men's under-20 football team

2023 PSSI U-20 Mini Tournament

2023 AFC U-20 Asian Cup

Women's national football team

2024 AFC Women's Olympic Qualifying Tournament

Women's under-20 football team

2024 AFC U-20 Women's Asian Cup qualification

References